4 Corps, 4th Corps, Fourth Corps, or IV Corps may refer to:

France
 4th Army Corps (France)
 IV Cavalry Corps (Grande Armée), a cavalry unit of the Imperial French Army during the Napoleonic Wars
 IV Corps (Grande Armée), a unit of the Imperial French Army during the Napoleonic Wars

Germany
 IV Cavalry Corps (German Empire), a unit of the Imperial German Army
 IV Corps (German Empire), a unit of the Imperial German Army
 IV Reserve Corps (German Empire), a unit of the Imperial German Army
 IV Army Corps (Wehrmacht), a unit of the German Army in World War II

Soviet Union 
 4th Airborne Corps (Soviet Union)
4th Guards Army Corps
4th Guards Cavalry Corps
 4th Cavalry Corps (Soviet Union)
4th Guards Mechanized Corps
 4th Mechanized Corps (Soviet Union)
 4th Rifle Corps
4th Guards Tank Corps

United States
 IV Corps (United States)
 IV Corps (Union Army)
 Fourth Corps, Army of Northern Virginia
 Fourth Army Corps (Spanish–American War)

Others
 4th Army Corps (Armenia)
 4th Army Corps (Azerbaijan)
 IV Army Corps (Greece)
 IV Corps (Hungary)
 IV Corps (India)
 IV Corps (North Korea)
 IV Corps (Ottoman Empire)
 IV Corps (Pakistan)
 4th Territorial Army Corps (Romania)
 IV Corps (South Vietnam)
 IV Army Corps (Spain)
 IV Corps (United Kingdom)
 4th Corps (Vietnam People's Army)

See also
List of military corps by number
 4th Army (disambiguation)
 4th Brigade (disambiguation)
 4th Division (disambiguation)
 4th Regiment (disambiguation)
 4th Squadron (disambiguation)